Chartwell Retirement Residences is the largest provider of seniors' housing in Canada, with over 200 locations across Quebec, Ontario, Alberta, and British Columbia. Chartwell offers independent living (IL), independent supportive living (ISL), assisted living (AL), memory care (MC), and long-term care (LTC) facilities across Canada.

In 2017, Chartwell's revenues were CAD $796.34 million, with a net income of CAD $13.08 million. As of June 25, 2018, the market capitalization of Chartwell was CAD $3.23 billion, and it had more than CAD $3 billion in assets. In 2018, the value of the enterprise was approximately CAD $5 billion.

History
Chartwell was founded in 1998 through the merger of JBG Management Inc., Alert Care Corporation, and Chartwell Care Corporation – forming a new entity named Chartwell Seniors Housing Real Estate Investment Trust. It was rebranded as Chartwell Retirement Residences in 2012. Chartwell is an unincorporated, open-ended trust that is governed by the laws of Ontario.
Chartwell head office is based in Mississauga, Ontario, as well as one corporate office in Montreal, Quebec. Chartwell’s portfolio consists of over 200 owned and managed residences. Its long-term care segment make up 10% of its business. As of the end of December 2020, Chartwell employed over 16,000 staff members across the country. Chartwell is the largest seniors housing provider in Canada.

Leadership team
Chartwell's senior executive committee is made up of four individuals. Vlad Volodarski is the chief executive officer, Karen Sullivan is the president and chief operating officer, Jonathan Boulakia is the chief legal officer and the chief investment officer, and Sheri Harris is the chief financial officer.

From 2009-2019, Brent Binions served as President and CEO of Chartwell Retirement Residences. Under his leadership, the company became the largest seniors’ housing company in Canada across four provinces. Mr. Binions is a past President of the Ontario Long term Care Association, past Vice President of the Ontario Residential Care Association and past Vice President for Ontario Retirement Communities Association. He is currently retired, but still sits on Chartwell’s Board of Directors.

Former Ontario Premier Mike Harris has been chairman of the board at Chartwell since about a year after his premiership ended; since then, he has been compensated roughly $3.5-million for his services, mostly in Chartwell stock.

Corporate giving
In 2015, Chartwell assisted in the creation and became the main sponsor of Wish of a Lifetime Canada, a charitable organization focused on granting wishes to seniors in Canada. Chartwell also continues to grant resident wishes through its Moments that Matter program, part of their recreation team’s activity programming in their retirement and long-term care homes.

In 2010, Chartwell created and published a book entitled Honour to commemorate Canada’s Second World War veterans.

COVID-19 response
During the COVID-19 pandemic of 2020–2021, Chartwell was in the "spotlight" as an operator of for-profit care, which had disproportionately high COVID-19 resident deaths compared to not-for-profit or municipal retirement residences in Ontario.  It also sparked controversy by paying its shareholders and board members tens of millions in dividends while at the same time receiving tens of millions in emergency funding from the Province of Ontario. The announcement that former Ontario Premier and current Chartwell chairman of the board Mike Harris would be receiving the Order of Ontario consequently sparked controversy.

References

Companies listed on the Toronto Stock Exchange
Companies based in Mississauga
Health care companies of Canada
Real estate companies of Canada
Housing for the elderly
Old age in Canada